The Texas Streak is a 1926 American silent Western film directed by Lynn Reynolds and starring Hoot Gibson. It was produced and distributed by Universal Pictures. A copy survives in a private collector's collection.

Cast
 Hoot Gibson as Chad Pennington
 Blanche Mehaffey as Amy Hollis
 Alan Roscoe as Jefferson Powell
 James A. Marcus as Colonel Hollis
 Jack Curtis as Jiggs
 Slim Summerville as Swede
 Les Bates as Casey
 Jack Murphy as Jimmie Hollis
 William H. Turner as Surveyor Logan

References

External links
 The Texas Streak at IMDb.com
 
 lobby poster

1926 films
Universal Pictures films
Films directed by Lynn Reynolds
1926 Western (genre) films
American black-and-white films
Silent American Western (genre) films
1920s American films